Foreign Legion is a punk band from South Wales.

History

1984–1991 
Foreign Legion formed in 1984 from the ashes of a band called Society, later Dead On Arrival. Dead on Arrival had one song on 1984's Bullsheep Detector album. Following the name change to Foreign Legion (due partly to people shortening it to DOA, which could cause confusion with the Canadian band of that name) and a number of line-up changes (drummers in particular) the band released their first EP in 1986, on their own Rent a Racket label with the line-up of M.H. on vocals, Lynne Murphy on guitar, Helen James on bass and Paul (Marshon) Marsh on drums. Later line-up changes included Paul Marsh introducing keyboards to the band for a short while, Andrew Heggie taking over on guitar and Steven Thomas on bass.Despite many live shows in London, Wales and France, three years passed before Surf City their second EP was released, with their first full-length album entitled Welcome to Fort Zinderneuf also released that same year, 1989. By this time a new line-up had evolved with Mark (Jolly) Williams on bass (from local band Blind Justice, who Andrew Heggie soon joined), together with Peter Giles on guitar and Ben Stansfield on drums, retaining only M.H. on vocals.  During the 1980s the band played regular slots in the famous 100 Club and supported the likes of UK Subs, The Vibrators, The Partisans, Picture Frame Seduction, The Adicts, Major Accident, Toy Dolls, Angelic Upstarts, 999, Broken Bones and others including Bérurier Noir for one of their first concerts overseas in France, following gig exchanges with Burning Ambitions from Le Havre. They also supported The Alarm, Joe Strummer & the Latino Rockabilly War and the UK Subs when they visited the band's home town of Merthyr Tydfil.
The band split up in 1991.

2000–present 
Foreign Legion re-formed in 2000, with members from before the 1991 split; M.H. on vocals, Mark (Jolly) Williams on guitar, Andrew Heggie on bass and Ben Stansfield on drums. They released a split album with Major Accident called Cry of the Legion, before their next full-length album What Goes Around, Comes Around, produced by Mick Jones of The Clash. During the early 2000s the band released EPs and played in mainland Europe and USA with the Dropkick Murphys, Major Accident, The Templars, NY Relics and the UK Subs ,The Misfits, Agnostic Front, Bad Manners, Stiff Little Fingers, The Buzzcocks including a show at New York's CBGBs. In 2007 the album Death Valley was recorded, featuring more new material as well as a re-worked version of Message From Nowhere from the first EP. By 2008 Jarrad (Nöir) Owens and Paul Black had joined the band. This lineup re-recorded six songs written by Mark (Jolly) Williams at SKWAD HQ South Wales – the session captured the band's newly invigorated live sound; with double kick drums and distorted fuzz bass the thrash and metal influences of the new rhythm section were clearly evident. These recordings eventually became the band's contribution to Reality Bites a split 12 track CD album with US band Sledgeback and also appeared bootlegged, with an incorrect lineup credited.

Following an appearance at the Legendary TJs in Newport in 2008, supporting the Anti-Nowhere League, guitarist Williams posted a statement on the band's Myspace account announcing his departure; Black and Owens soon followed.
Members of local Caerphilly punk covers band Doc Savage joined M.H. in Foreign Legion for a short while before a new line-up emerged with the drummer from 1980s Cwmbran punk band Impact (who also featured on the 1984 Bullsheep Detector album) Glyn (Sid Lovely) Bendon, together with Simon Bendon on guitar and Canis Humanus on bass.

A split EP with German band Riot Company was released in 2011, with a further split EP released in 2012 with Italian band Cervelli Stanki. The band were now back on the road with gigs including the Rebellion festival alongside bands including PiL, Rancid, Buzzcocks and Social Distortion.

Demob bassist Steve Zuki joined the band in 2013, with live performances including two German festivals: Punk and Disorderly and Back On The Streets, a tour of northern Italy and performances in the UK, including headlining the first day at Gosport Punk Festival (with the UK Subs headlining the other day) and support slots alongside Sham 69, 999, Stiff Little Fingers and The Men They Couldn't Hang plus a return to the Rebellion festival alongside bands including Sham 69, Jello Biafra and the Guantanamo School of Medicine, GBH, Discharge, Peter Hook and The Light, TV Smith and many more.

Light at the End of the Tunnel was recorded in 2013 and released on Germany's KB Records in August 2013. Featuring one song sung by bassist Zuki, the album features a number of songs referencing the band's Welsh working-class background, including Market Trader, Regeneration (Council List), and Miners (The Fathers' Sacrifice). The cover image by fellow Merthyr resident Gus Payne depicts a Welsh miner kneeling with his hand on the hilt of a sword planted into the ground, possibly referencing the sword in the stone myth and, along with the album title and the closing track Phoenix From The Flame, provides a positive theme with hope for the future. Vocalist M.H. confirms this intent to project hope for the future; "Light At The End Of The Tunnel is meant to give hope and strength to all the working class people all over the word, that the shining sword...".

Discography

Albums

7-inch vinyl

Compilations 

As Dead On Arrival

Bibliography 
Burning Britain: The History of UK Punk 1980–1984 by Ian Glasper (four pages on the band). Cherry Red Books (2004).

References

External links 
 Foreign Legion's Facebook page
 Foreign Legion's Youtube
2012 interview with vocalist Marcus Howells
2012 interview with vocalist Marcus Howells
2012 interview with vocalist Marcus Howells

Welsh punk rock groups
Welsh rock music groups
Street punk groups
Underground punk scene in the United Kingdom
Musical groups established in 1984
Musical groups disestablished in 1991
Musical groups reestablished in 2000
Musical quartets
People from Merthyr Tydfil